The 2014 Kuurne–Brussels–Kuurne took place on 2 March 2014.

Results

References

Kuurne–Brussels–Kuurne
Kuurne
Kuurne